Parliamentary elections took place in the Republic of Crimea on 8 September 2019. These were the second elections since Crimea's annexation into the Russian Federation. The result saw an absolute majority victory for President Vladimir Putin's United Russia party but with a loss of seats.

References

2019 elections in Russia
2019 elections in Ukraine
Elections in Crimea
Annexation of Crimea by the Russian Federation
Regional legislative elections in Russia